Elachipalayam is a revenue block, in the Namakkal district of Tamil Nadu, in India. It includes :
Agaram,
Akkalampatty, 
Bommampatty, 
Chinnamanali, 
Elangar, 
Elupili, 
85 Goundampalayam, 
87 Goundampalayam, 
Kilapalayam, 
Kokkalai, 
Konnaiyar, 
Koothampoondi, 
Kuppandapalayam, 
Lathuvadi, 
Manathi, 
Mandagapalayam, 
Marukalampatty, 
Mavureddipatty, 
Molipali, 
Musiri, 
Nallipalayam, 
Periyamanali, 
Pokkampalayam, 
Punjaiputhupalayam, 
Pullagoundampatty, 
Puthur East, 
Sakthinaicampalayam, 
Thondipatty, 
Unjanai.

References 
 

Revenue blocks of Namakkal district